Scott Lawrence (born September 27, 1963) is an American actor best known for his role as Cmdr. Sturgis Turner on the CBS series JAG. Lawrence played the role from 2001 until 2005, when the series ended. He is also known for being the major audio double for James Earl Jones, voicing Darth Vader in Star Wars video games since 1995.

Career
Lawrence began his career in Hollywood in the late 1980s with supporting TV and film appearances. He debuted as a perpetrator defended by James Earl Jones in LA Law. He had a recurring role on Murphy Brown and in the early 1990s was a semi-regular on the Whoopi Goldberg series Bagdad Cafe.

In film, his first appearance was in the 1990 thriller The First Power with Lou Diamond Phillips. He next appeared in the Drew Barrymore 1993 horror film Doppelganger. Other credits include the Jean-Claude Van Damme vehicle Timecop and Howard Stern's Private Parts.

From 1994 to 2006, Lawrence voiced Darth Vader in the Star Wars video game series produced by LucasArts. After his performance in Star Wars: Empire at War, he was succeeded by Matt Sloan. Lawrence returned to the role in the game Star Wars Jedi: Fallen Order in 2019.

In 2011, Lawrence made an appearance in NCIS, a spin-off of JAG in the Season 8 episode, "A Man Walks Into a Bar..." albeit as a different character.

His film appearances include the blockbuster film Avatar and 2010's The Social Network.

In 2019, Lawrence appeared as Special Agent Billy Taggart in the critically acclaimed Netflix series Unbelievable.

In 2020, Lawrence appeared as a guest on the Studio 60 on the Sunset Strip marathon fundraiser episode of The George Lucas Talk Show.

Selected filmography

Film

Television

Video games

References

External links

1963 births
Living people
Male actors from Los Angeles
African-American male actors
American male television actors
American male film actors
American male voice actors
American male video game actors
20th-century American male actors
21st-century American male actors
20th-century African-American people
21st-century African-American people